John Owiti is a retired Kenyan sprinter.

Owiti competed for Kenya in the 1962 British Empire and Commonwealth Games in Perth finishing second in first round heat in the 100 yards with a time 9.8 seconds. In the second round, Owiti posted the slightly slower time of 10.2 seconds and finished fourth in his heat. In the 220 yards, Owiti again did not advance to the semi finals after covering the distance in 22.4 seconds in both the first and second rounds. The same result was achieved in the 100 metres at the 1964 Summer Olympics in Mexico City where Owiti finished both of the heats in 10.6 seconds. The following year at the 1965 All-Africa Games in Brazzaville, Owiti achieved the silver medal in the 100 metres for finishing second in the final in 10.5 seconds behind the Ivoirian Gaoussou Koné.

References

1942 births
Living people
Kenyan male sprinters
Olympic athletes of Kenya
Athletes (track and field) at the 1964 Summer Olympics
Commonwealth Games competitors for Kenya
Athletes (track and field) at the 1962 British Empire and Commonwealth Games
Athletes (track and field) at the 1966 British Empire and Commonwealth Games
Place of birth missing (living people)
African Games silver medalists for Kenya
African Games medalists in athletics (track and field)
Athletes (track and field) at the 1965 All-Africa Games
Date of birth missing (living people)